Prajmaline (Neo-gilurythmal) is a class Ia antiarrhythmic agent which has been available since the 1970s. Class Ia drugs increase the time one action potential lasts in the heart. Prajmaline is a semi-synthetic propyl derivative of ajmaline, with a higher bioavailability than its predecessor. It acts to stop arrhythmias of the heart through a frequency-dependent block of cardiac sodium channels.

Mechanism
Prajmaline causes a resting block in the heart. A resting block is the depression of a person's Vmax after a resting period. This effect is seen more in the atrium than the ventricle. The effects of some Class I antiarrhythmics are only seen in a patient who has a normal heart rate (~1 Hz). This is due to the effect of a phenomenon called reverse use dependence. The higher the heart rate, the less effect Prajmaline will have.

Uses
The drug Prajmaline has been used to treat a number of cardiac disorders. These include: coronary artery disease, angina, paroxysmal tachycardia and Wolff–Parkinson–White syndrome. Prajmaline has been indicated in the treatment of certain disorders where other antiarrhythmic drugs were not effective.

Administration
Prajmaline can be administered orally, parenterally or intravenously. Three days after the last dose, a limited effect has been observed. Therefore, it has been suggested that treatment of arrhythmias with Prajmaline must be continuous to see acceptable results.

Pharmacokinetics
The main metabolites of Prajmaline are: 21-carboxyprajmaline and hydroxyprajmaline. Twenty percent of the drug is excreted in the urine unchanged.

Daily therapeutic dose is 40–80 mg.
Distribution half-life is 10 minutes.
Plasma protein binding is 60%.
Oral bioavailability is 80%.
Elimination half-life is 6 hours.
Volume of distribution is 4-5 L/kg.

Side Effects
There are no significant adverse side-effects of Prajmaline when taken alone and with a proper dosage.  Patients who are taking other treatments for their symptoms (e.g. beta blockers and nifedipine) have developed minor transient conduction defects when given Prajmaline.

Overdose
An overdose of Prajmaline is possible. The range of symptoms seen during a Prajmaline overdose include: no symptoms, nausea/vomiting, bradycardia, tachycardia, hypotension, and death.

Other Potential Uses
Due to Prajmaline's sodium channel-blocking properties, it has been shown to protect rat white matter from anoxia (82 +/- 15%). The concentration used causes little suppression of the preanoxic response.

References

Alkaloids
Sodium channel blockers
Secondary alcohols